Pope Julius could refer to:

Pope Julius I (337–352)
Pope Julius II, (1503–1513) The Warrior Pope
Pope Julius (game), a card game thought to be named after Pope Julius II
Pope Julius III (1550–1555)

Julius